This is an incomplete list of earthquakes in Georgia (country).

See also
Geology of Georgia (country)

References

Sources

Further reading

Earthquakes in Georgia (country)
Georgia (country)
Earthquakes
Earthquakes